Hashim Raza Allahabadi Abdi (1929-1989) was an Indian politician . He was a Member of Parliament, representing Uttar Pradesh in the Rajya Sabha the upper house of India's Parliament as a member of the Congress (I) He was also member of Uttar Pradesh Legislative Council from 1976 to 1982.

References

1929 births
1989 deaths
Rajya Sabha members from Uttar Pradesh
Indian National Congress politicians from Uttar Pradesh
Members of the Uttar Pradesh Legislative Council